Captain Gatso is a pseudonymous England-based political activist involved in motorists' rights, specifically relating to speed limit enforcement. The name derives from speed cameras, some of which are manufactured by Gatsometer BV and referred to by the abbreviation Gatso.

Gatso styles himself as the Campaign Director or Operations Director of Motorists Against Detection (MAD), a group which reportedly claims responsibility for speed camera destruction and damage.

References

External links
Captain Gatso's Blog
Motorists Against Detection

Living people
English activists
Unidentified people
Traffic enforcement cameras
Year of birth missing (living people)